Veselin Velikov (born 19 March 1977) is a former Bulgarian footballer, and currently manager.

Career
Velikov was the manager of Dunav Ruse from June 2014 till October 2017, when he left the club by mutual consent.

On 3 January 2018, Velikov was appointed as the new manager of Tsarsko Selo Sofia after old manager Nikola Spasov was announced as the new manager of the Kazakhstan Premier League team Kyzylzhar.

On 20 June 2021, Velikov was announced as the new manager of Etar Veliko Tarnovo.

References

External links
 

1977 births
Living people
Bulgarian footballers
Bulgaria international footballers
FC Etar Veliko Tarnovo players
PFC CSKA Sofia players
PFC Marek Dupnitsa players
Kavala F.C. players
PFC Rodopa Smolyan players
FC Lyubimets players
First Professional Football League (Bulgaria) players
Bulgarian expatriate footballers
Expatriate footballers in Greece
Bulgarian football managers
Association football defenders